The Indonesian one thousand rupiah coin (Rp1,000) is a coin of the Indonesian rupiah. It circulates alongside the 1,000-rupiah banknote. First introduced on 8 March 1993 as bimetallic coins, it is now minted as unimetallic coins, with the first of its kind appearing in 2010 and its latest revision being in 2016.

First issue (1993-1997, 2000)

This is the first issue of the 1,000-rupiah coin. Being bimetallic, it has a cupronickel outer edge and an inner circle made out of aluminum-nickel-bronze alloy. It weighs 8.6g, has a 26mm diameter, is 2.2mm thick, and has a jagged edge. The coin's obverse features the national emblem Garuda Pancasila with the year of issue in its aluminum-nickel-bronze inner circle and the lettering "BANK INDONESIA" on its cupronickel outer ring, while its reverse features an oil palm in the inner circle with the lettering "KELAPA SAWIT" (oil palm) as well as "Rp1000" on the outer ring. Coins of this kind bear the mint years 1993, 1994, 1995, 1996, 1997, and 2000.

This coin is subject to a controversy where several online vendors sell this coin for up to Rp100 million apiece while in reality these coins are only sold at a retail price of Rp3,000 through Rp10,000 apiece, with the highest proof-grade coins being worth up to Rp4,000,000. Furthermore, this coin is also still legal tender, which means that its actual numismatic value is far more minuscule than what was initially thought.

Second issue (2010)

The Rp1,000 coin was reminted again, this time as a unimetallic coin made out of nickel-plated steel, in 2010. It was first announced on 20 July of the same year. Its obverse contains the national emblem Garuda Pancasila as well as the lettering "1000 RUPIAH." Meanwhile, its reverse displays the West Javanese musical instrument angklung as well as the Gedung Sate in its capital Bandung and the lettering "ANGKLUNG" and "2010." Its diameter is 24.15mm, is 1.6mm thick, weighs 4.5g, and has a smooth edge.

Third issue (2016)
The Rp1,000 coins were redesigned on 19 December 2016. Its obverse now features the national hero I Gusti Ketut Puja, the national emblem Garuda Pancasila, and the lettering "REPUBLIK INDONESIA." Meanwhile, the reverse now contains the lettering "BANK INDONESIA," "1000 RUPIAH," and "2016," as well as a relief in the form of circles encircling its inner edge. Coins of this kind are minted with nickel-plated steel, weigh 4.5g, have a 24.1mm diameter, is 1.45mm thick, and has a smooth edge.

Non-circulating coin with portrait of General Sudirman (1970)
Alongside the three circulating versions listed, the Bank of Indonesia also once minted a silver Rp1,000 non-circulating coin to commemorate Indonesia's 25th independence anniversary in 1970. This coin weighs 40g, has a diameter of 55mm, and has a reeded edge. On the obverse is the national emblem Garuda Pancasila, the Bank of Indonesia's logo, and the lettering "1945-1970" and "1000 RUPIAH" alongside the year of issue (1970). Meanwhile, the reverse of the coin features General Sudirman's portrait as well as the lettering "25 TAHUN KEMERDEKAAN" and "REPUBLIK INDONESIA."

See also
 Coins of the rupiah

References

Indonesian rupiah
Currencies of Indonesia